The Vanessa Phillips Women's Tournament was a tournament for professional female tennis players played on outdoor hard courts. The event was classified as a $75,000 ITF Women's Circuit tournament. It was held in Eilat, Israel, in 2013.

Past finals

Singles

Doubles

External links 
 Official website
 ITF search

ITF Women's World Tennis Tour
Tennis tournaments in Israel
Hard court tennis tournaments